Tillandsia rohdenardinii is a species of flowering plant in the family Bromeliaceae, native to south Brazil (Rio Grande do Sul). It was first described by Teresia Strehl in 2004.

Tillandsia rohdenardinii is a species in the genus Tillandsia. This species is native to Brazil. , the Encyclopedia of Bromeliads regarded it as a synonym of Tillandsia winkleri, which it placed in subgenus Anoplophytum.

References

rohdenardinii
Flora of Brazil